There Is Nothing Left to Lose is the third studio album by American rock band Foo Fighters, released on November 2, 1999, through Roswell and RCA Records. It marked the first appearance of drummer Taylor Hawkins, and is often seen as a departure from the band's previous work, showcasing a softer, more experimental sound. Dave Grohl has stated that the album was "totally based on melody" and that it might be "[his] favorite album that [they've] ever done."

There Is Nothing Left to Lose won the Grammy Award for Best Rock Album in 2001, marking the band's first ever Grammy win. The band would go on to win the Grammy for Best Rock Album for three of their next four studio releases (One by One; Echoes, Silence, Patience & Grace; and Wasting Light).

There Is Nothing Left to Lose is Foo Fighters' first album to be entirely released and marketed by RCA Records since their departure from Capitol Records after release of The Colour and the Shape two years earlier. Their two previous studio albums, originally distributed by Capitol, were since then distributed by RCA.

Background
Prior to recording, guitarist Franz Stahl was fired, as frontman Dave Grohl felt the guitarist had not found his place in the band. At that point, Grohl decided that the band would just be a three-piece for the record, along with bassist Nate Mendel and drummer Taylor Hawkins. Having just slaved themselves in the studio making the last record The Colour and the Shape and losing two band members in the process, he decided to buy a house in Alexandria, Virginia and make the record in its basement without any record company presence during production. This was helped by the Foo Fighters' leaving Capitol Records after president Gary Gersh left the label. Grohl named his home facility Studio 606, at first saying, "It's just one of those numbers that's everywhere. Like when you wake up in the middle of the night and it's 6:06, or you see a license plate that says 606." He later told the full story of the number's significance in a July 20, 2020, Instagram post: spending the evening with his father in 1985, he received a particularly searing "what do you want to do with your life" lecture that defines the bittersweet moment he finally communicated to his father the depth of his commitment to becoming a professional musician, before sneaking out. "606" was his father's apartment number.

Grohl set up the studio with the help of Adam Kasper, who eventually co-produced the album. The biggest challenge, according to Grohl, was making the record sound good without computer programs such as Pro Tools or AutoTune. Dave Grohl notes that he had: "[...] been living in Los Angeles for about a year and a half, just being a drunk, getting fucked up every night and doing horrible shit, and I'd finally gotten sick of that new car smell. So I bought this great house in Virginia and told everyone I was building a studio in the basement. It was literally a basement with sleeping bags on the walls!"

In 2006, Grohl stated that: "It was all about just settling into the next phase of your life, that place where you can sit back and relax because there had been so much crazy shit in the past three years. At that point it was me, Taylor and Nate and we were best friends. It was one of the most relaxing times of my whole life. All we did was eat chili, drink beer and whiskey and record whenever we felt like it. When I listen to that record it totally brings me back to that basement. I remember how it smelled and how it was in the Spring so the windows were open and we'd do vocals until you could hear the birds through the microphone. And more than any other record I've ever done, that album does that to me."

The title emerged to Grohl as he talked to a friend "about when you experience these emotions after you've been through a long, difficult period and you finally give into this feeling that, quite simply, there is nothing left to lose. It can seem... positive, desperate and reckless." The frontman also said that it represented the band's mood during production: "we just wrote off and played like all bets were off. No one was forcing us to be there, so it had to be fun—and the songs had to be the best we could possibly come up with at the time."

Release and promotion
After the album was ready, the band signed with RCA Records to distribute the album. For promotion, the label focused on "getting the Foo Fighters brand out there", setting up the band's official website, and arranging appearances on broadcast television and events such as the Gravity Games. There Is Nothing Left to Lose was released in an Enhanced CD featuring the music video for the first single, "Learn to Fly", along with song lyrics and photographs.

While the album was recorded as a three-piece, Grohl decided that he still needed a second guitarist for the live performances. After open auditions in which 35 musicians were tested, the band hired Chris Shiflett, whom Grohl considered the best guitarist and singer who auditioned, and "he fit in with the rest of us so well", particularly for his background in punk rock bands. In September 1999, the band performed club dates in New York and Los Angeles, to both showcase the new songs and test Shiflett's performance with the group. The There Is Nothing Left To Lose tour started in 2000. The North American leg was overlapped with the Red Hot Chili Peppers' Californication Tour.

Early pressings of the disc included a temporary tattoo, similar to the one featured on the album cover. The album was also re-released in 2001 in Australia as a two-CD edition which offers a second VCD disc of four videos and one bonus track, "Fraternity."

Critical reception

Reviews for There Is Nothing Left to Lose were generally positive. Rolling Stones Greg Kot rated the album three-and-a-half out of five stars. He started by explaining that "the first thirty seconds [...] are a bridge to singer Dave Grohl's past." He stated further, comparing the album to the Goo Goo Dolls' "Iris", that "[Grohl's] punk background makes him allergic to string sections." However, he said that it "nonetheless marks a departure, with greater emphasis on melody and actual singing." In a retrospective review, AllMusic's Stephen Thomas Erlewine rated the album four out of five stars, explaining that "it is the first Foo Fighters album that sounds like the work of a unified, muscular band, and the first one that rocks really hard." Furthermore, he stated that it "has a stripped-down sound and an immediate attack that makes even the poppier numbers rock hard." He concluded that "[Foo Fighters] make it sound easy and fun [...] they're getting better as they're losing members and growing older, which is certainly a rarity in rock & roll." In another retrospective review, a reviewer for Sputnikmusic rated it 3.5 out of 5 points. He explained that it was "consistent and includes sufficient highlights" overall. He went on to state that "Stacked Actors" "successfully utilizes some cool guitar effects as well as the quiet/loud formula that the band has become known for." He further stated that "Breakout" "is a really satisfying mix of melody and rock that ends up a genuinely memorable tune." However, he stated that ""Headwires" [...] musically begins like a mediocre mid-80's radio-rock effort and then simply lacks the necessary grunt to salvage it later on." Comparing the album to The Colour and the Shape, he stated that while the newer album is "more consistent", "a number of tracks ... [are] rather straight-forward and lacking that certain memorable factor which so helped its predecessor."

Awards
Grammy Awards

"When we won for best rock album, which we made in my basement, I was so proud – because we made it in my basement in a crappy makeshift studio that we put together ourselves. I stood there looking out at everybody in tuxedos and diamonds and fur coats, and I thought we were probably the only band that won a Grammy for an album made for free in a basement that year." – Dave Grohl, 2012

Track listing

Personnel

Foo Fighters
Dave Grohl – lead vocals, guitars, drums, percussion, loops, mellotron on "Next Year", talk box on "Generator", production, art direction
Nate Mendel – bass, production, art direction
Taylor Hawkins – drums, percussion, production, art direction

Production
Adam Kasper – producer, recording, mixing (tracks 1, 2, 4, 5, 8–11)
Andy Wallace – mixing (tracks 3, 6, 7)
John Nelson – assistant mixing engineer (tracks 1, 2, 4, 5, 8–11)
Tod Reiger – assistant mixing engineer (tracks 3, 6, 7)
Bob Ludwig – mastering
Henry Marquez – art direction
Danny Clinch – photography
Management – G.A.S Entertainment Co.

Charts

Weekly charts

Year-end charts

Certifications

References

External links

1999 albums
Foo Fighters albums
Albums produced by Adam Kasper
RCA Records albums
Grammy Award for Best Rock Album
Albums recorded in a home studio